Anthony Trevelyan "Rufus" Rogers  (12 July 1913 – 18 August 2009) was a New Zealand medical doctor and a politician of the Labour Party.

Biography
Rogers was born in New Plymouth on 12 July 1913, the son of Eugene Trevelyan "Tim" Rogers and Gwendoline Rogers. The doctor who delivered him spotted some rust-coloured hairs on his head and wanted to call him a "haematite", but his mother insisted that if anything, he was to be called Rufus. That name always stuck. Rogers was educated at Whitiora School and Hamilton High School, as well as Nelson College from 1930 to 1931, and the University of Otago, where he completed MB ChB degrees in 1938.

Rogers served with the Royal Army Medical Corps from 1939 to 1946. On 27 January 1945, he married Prudence Cecilia Romilly at St Mary's Church, Newick, Sussex, England, and the couple went on to have four children. Returning to New Zealand, Rogers practised in Hamilton as a general practitioner from 1946.

In 1956, a local campaign began to have a university in Hamilton. The barrister and solicitor Douglas Seymour chaired the lobby group for the first five years, and was succeeded in that role by Rogers. In 1964, their work was done and the University of Waikato was officially opened by the governor-general, Sir Bernard Fergusson. Rogers' brother, Denis Rogers, was the university's first chancellor from 1964 to 1969.

Not even a member of the party at the time, he thought he must have been mistaken for his brother, Denis Rogers, who had been mayor of Hamilton from 1959 to 1968. Rufus Rogers represented the Hamilton East electorate for one parliamentary term from 1972 to 1975, when he was defeated by National's Ian Shearer. According to Trevor Mallard, Rogers was "probably one of the last true socialists in Parliament".

In the 1987 New Year Honours, Rogers was appointed a Companion of the Queen's Service Order for public services.

Rogers' wife, Pru, died in 1998. Rufus Rogers died in Hamilton on 18 August 2009, and his ashes were buried in Hamilton East Cemetery.

References

1913 births
2009 deaths
New Zealand Labour Party MPs
People educated at Nelson College
University of Otago alumni
Companions of the Queen's Service Order
New Zealand MPs for North Island electorates
Members of the New Zealand House of Representatives
New Zealand general practitioners
University of Waikato
Unsuccessful candidates in the 1975 New Zealand general election
20th-century New Zealand medical doctors
20th-century New Zealand politicians
British Army personnel of World War II
Royal Army Medical Corps officers